Tsuria Díaz Bolio Reyes (born in Mexico City, Distrito Federal, Mexico, May 7, 1989) is a Mexican actress known as Tsuria Díaz.

Biography
Tsuria at a very early age shows an interest for performance, due to this fact she begins auditioning and participates in several TV commercials.
In 1998 her career officially starts, working as a sports reporter for Canal 5 (XHGC-TV) an open channel in Mexico.

During this period of time, from 2000 to 2004 she continues her participation in different TV commercials. At the same time， she studies acting in Casa Azul, the Argos Comunicación acting academy.

After this shop with Guillermo Rios, she plays the role Marimar in the play “Perras”.

Later in 2008, she antagonizes in the TV series “Me Mueves” as Cristina for Once TV Mexico.
In 2011, she studies Short Acting Courses in Central School of Speech & Drama (CSSD) University of London.
The same year, she takes part of the main cast of “El Octavo Mandamiento” as Cecilia Gallardo an Argos Comunicación production for Cadena Tres, with the Director José Luis García Agraz.

In 2012, she is part of the cast in the TV series “La Ruta Blanca” as Rosa, an El Mall production directed by Carlos Garcia Agraz.

The same year， she is part of the main cast “Rosa Diamante” a Telemundo soap opera with the role Valeria Sotelo.

In 2014, she studied at Centro de Educación Artística CEA Televisa. In 2015, she participates in the TV show “Como dice el dicho”.

In 2016, she moves to Los Angeles to Stella Adler Studio of Acting.

Filmography

Movies

Television

Soap operas

TV Series

Theater

References

External links
 

1989 births
Living people
Mexican telenovela actresses
Mexican television actresses
Mexican film actresses